Robert Frank Johnson  (born 17 October 1943) is a former Australian politician who was a member of the Legislative Assembly of Western Australia from 1993 to 2017. He was elected as a member of the Liberal Party, and served as a minister in the government of Colin Barnett from 2008 to 2012, but resigned from the party in 2016 to sit as an independent. He was defeated at the 2017 election.

Political career

Local politics
Johnson was born in London, England. At the age of 35, he was elected as a councillor for the London Borough of Sutton and subsequently became Mayor.

Soon after emigrating to Australia in 1988, he was elected as a councillor to the City of Wanneroo in 1991. The following year he was elected Mayor.

Western Australian Parliament
Johnson was elected as the member for Whitford in 1993 and, following a re-distribution of boundaries, was re-elected for the seat of Hillarys in 1996.

From December 1999 until February 2001, Johnson served in the Court Coalition government, as Minister for Works, Services, Citizenship and Multicultural Interests. He became Minister for Police, Emergency Services and Road Safety with the return to power of the Coalition in September 2008.

Johnson supports reintroducing the Death Penalty, in 2007 he lobbyed the Western Australia liberal party to adopt a policy on capital punishment.

In his first two years as minister in the new Barnett government, Johnson introduced 16 bills into the Legislative Assembly. Many of them were controversial and high-profile, including increasing the impounding period of a vehicle for anyone convicted of a "hoon" offence. Other measures were to ensure motorists with a blood alcohol reading of 0.08 or above lost their licence immediately at the roadside, that all revenue from speed and red light cameras would go to road safety projects, and a proposal for Australia's first online sex offender register.

In early 2011, political commentator Peter van Onselen named Johnson among Australia's "top ten politicians you could trust", writing that "he is real and what you see is what you get".

Investigations following a major bushfire in the Perth hills in February 2011, with the loss of 71 homes, and another in the Margaret River area, resulted in severe criticism of Johnson, and he was removed from the Emergency Services portfolio.

In May 2012, federal Liberal MP for Canning, Don Randall, attacked Johnson in Federal Parliament, labelling him bumbling, weak and incompetent. In turn, Johnson called for Randall to be sacked over the misuse of travel expenses.

After a cabinet reshuffle by premier Colin Barnett in June 2012, Johnson was removed from the Police and Road Safety portfolio. At the 2013 Western Australian state election, he was re-elected to the seat of Hillarys.

Business career
After arriving in Australia, Johnson started a family business incorporating an investment firm and a national computer distributorship.

He is a former chair of Radio Lollipop (Australia), a charity that cares for children in hospital.

References

Members of the Western Australian Legislative Assembly
Living people
1943 births
Councillors in the London Borough of Sutton
English emigrants to Australia
Liberal Party of Australia members of the Parliament of Western Australia
21st-century Australian politicians
Independent members of the Parliament of Western Australia
Recipients of the Medal of the Order of Australia
Western Australian local councillors
Mayors of places in Western Australia